The history of Luzon covers events that happened in the largest island of the Philippine Archipelago, Luzon. Luzon wrested the record of having the oldest man ever discovered in the Philippines with discovery of the Callao Man in 2007, which predated the Tabon Man by around 20,000 years. The written history of Luzon began in around 900 AD with the discovery of the Laguna Copperplate Inscription in 1989. After that, Luzon began to appear in the annals of the Chinese and Japanese. One example would be the Ming Shilu, wherein Luzon appeared in 22 records. Luzon was split among Hindu-Buddhist kingdoms, Muslim principalities, and ethnoreligious tribes, who had trading connections with Borneo, Malaya, Java, Indochina, India, Okinawa, Japan and China before the Spanish established their rule. As a result of the Spanish–American War, Luzon became American territory. In the Second World War, Luzon saw one of the fiercest battles during the Japanese occupation. Luzon, apart from being the largest island, had been the economic and political center of the Philippines ever since the country entered the Western Calendar, being home to the country's capital city, Manila, and the country's largest metropolis, Metro Manila.

Prehistory of Luzon

The first evidence of the systematic use of Stone-Age technologies in the Philippines is estimated to have dated back to about 50,000 BC, and this phase in the development of proto-Philippine societies is considered to end with the rise of metal tools in about 500 BC, although stone tools continued to be used past that date. However, new discoveries in Luzon, particularly in Liwan, Kalinga, found stone tools that were dated through potassium argon test at most 920,000 years old, and at least 750,000 years old.

The earliest human remains known in the Philippines are the fossilized remains discovered in 2007 by Armand Salvador Mijares in Callao Cave, Peñablanca, Cagayan. The find was of a 67,000-year-old remains that predate the Tabon Man, which was discovered in 1962 by Robert Bradford Fox. Specifically, the find consisted of a single 61 millimeter metatarsal which, when dated using uranium series ablation, was found to be at least about 67,000 years old. If definitively proven to be remains of Homo sapiens, since there was a certainty that the Callao Man could be a Homo floresiensis, it would antedate the 47,000-year-old remains of Tabon Man to become the earliest human remains known in the Philippines, and one of the oldest human remains in the Asia Pacific.

The primary theory surrounding the migration of Callao Man and his contemporaries to Luzon from what is believed to be the present-day Indonesia is that they came by raft. It is notable that the approximate time this happened is, according to experts, prior to the point when human beings were thought to be capable of making long voyages across the sea. It has also been noted that Callao Man could have crossed into the Philippines by a land bridge. This is because at the time Callao Man lived, it was the period known as Ice age and the sea level was lower. Because of lower sea levels, there could have been an Isthmus between the Philippines and the rest of Southeast Asia.

Cultural and technological achievements 

Mining in the Philippines began around 1000 BC. However, the discovery of a brass needle in Musang Cave, Cagayan pushed back the date to 2160 BC, the date the needle was made. Metal smiths from this era had already developed a crude version of modern metallurgical processes, notably the hardening of soft iron through carburization. However, unlike the typical pattern, there had been no shift to copper or bronze implements before iron implements, it had been from stone to iron.

History of Luzon during the Classical Period

Luzon in early world maps

Greeks may have reached the Visayan Islands around AD 21 and some scholars conflate accounts of the Golden Island (Sumatra) and Golden Chersonese (Malaysia) by classical writers such as Josephus, Pomponius Mela, and Ptolemy with locations in the Philippines. Gold jewelry of Philippine origin has been found in 1st-century Egypt.

Laguna Copperplate Inscription

The Laguna Copperplate Inscription is the earliest known written document found in the Philippines. The plate was found in 1989 by a sand labourer near the mouth of the Lumbang River in Barangay Wawa, Lumban, Laguna. The inscription on the plate was first deciphered by Dutch anthropologist Antoon Postma.

The inscription is on a thin copper plate measuring less than 20 × 30 cm (8 × 12 inches) in size with words directly embossed onto the plate. It differs in manufacture from other Javanese scrolls of the period, which had the words inscribed onto a heated, softened scroll of metal.

Inscribed on it the Saka era date year of Saka 822, month of Waisaka, the fourth day of the waning moon, which corresponds to Monday, 21 April 900 AD in the Gregorian calendar. The writing system used is the Kawi Script, while the language is a variety of Old Malay, and contains numerous loanwords from Sanskrit and a few non-Malay vocabulary elements whose origin is between Old Tagalog and Old Javanese. The document states that it releases its bearers, the children of Namwaran, from a debt in gold amounting to 1 kati and 8 suwarnas (865 grams). The original text was written with an English translation below. (Place names are in bold.)

Transliteration

English translation

Long Live! In the Year of Saka 822, month of Waisakha, according to the astronomer.

The fourth day of the waning moon, Monday. On this occasion, Lady Angkatan, and her relative whose name is Bukah, the children of the Honorable Namwaran, were awarded a document of complete pardon from the Commander-in-Chief of Tundun, represented by the Lord Minister of Pailah, Jayadewa.

This means that, through the Honorable Scribe, the Honourable Namwaran is totally cleared of his salary-related debts of 1 Katî and 8 Suwarna, before the Honorable Lord Minister of Puliran, Kasumuran; by the authority of the Lord Minister of Pailah, represented by Ganasakti.

the Honourable and widely-renowned Lord Minister of Binwagan, represented by Bisruta. And, with his whole family, upon ordered of the Lord Minister of Dewata, represented by the Chief of Mdang, because of his loyalty as a subject of the Commander-in-Chief.

Therefore, the living descendants of the Honorable Namwaran are cleared of all debts of the Honorable Namwaran to the Lord Minister of Dewata.

This, in any case, whosoever, sometime in the future, who shall state that the debt is not yet cleared of the Honorable...

The Laguna Copperplate Inscription, among other recent finds such as the Golden Tara of Butuan and 14th century pottery and gold jewellery in Cebu, is significant in revising precolonial Philippine history, which was until then considered by some Western historians to be culturally isolated from the rest of Asia, as no evident pre-Hispanic written records were found at the time. Noted Philippine historian William Henry Scott debunked these theories in 1968 with his Prehispanic Source materials for the Study of Philippine History which was subsequently published in 1984.

The Barangay government

The barangay government emerged in around 200 AD, which owed the name from the Malay boat balangay. In more developed barangays in the Visayas (e.g. Cebu, Bohol, and Panay) which were the first to be conquered by Spain by means of pacts, peace treaties, and reciprocal alliances, the datu was at the top of the social order in a sakop or haop (elsewhere referred to as barangay). In Luzon, the social structure had been less stable and more complex as compared to the barangays in the Visayas. Enjoying a more extensive commerce than those in Visayas, having the influence of Bornean political contacts, and engaging in farming wet rice for a living, the Tagalogs, who had established the dominant pre-colonial barangays in Luzon, were described by the Spanish Augustinian friar Martin de Rada as more traders than warriors.

The more complex social structure of the Luzon barangays was less stable because it was still in a process of differentiating. A Jesuit priest Francisco Colin made an attempt to give an approximate comparison of it with the Visayan social structure in the middle of the 17th century. The term datu or lakan, or apo refers to the chief, but the noble class to which the datu belonged to was known as the maginoo class. Any male member of the maginoo class can become a datu by personal achievement.

The Yongle Emperor instituted a Chinese Governor on Luzon during Zheng He's voyages and appointed Ko Ch'a-lao to that position in 1405. China also had vassals among the leaders in the archipelago. China attained ascendancy in trade with the area in Yongle's reign.

In circa 1595, the Spanish made a manuscript known as the Boxer Codex which contained illustrations of Filipinos during the early Spanish era. Aside from a description of, and historical allusions to the Philippines and various other Far Eastern countries, it also contains seventy-five colored drawings of the inhabitants of these regions and their distinctive costumes. At least fifteen illustrations deal with the natives of the Philippine Archipelago.

In the period between the 7th century to the beginning of the 15th century, numerous prosperous centers of trade had emerged, including the three city-states that formed in what is now Metro Manila, Cebu, Iloilo, Butuan, the Kingdom of Luyag na Caboloan situated in Pangasinan, the Kingdoms of Zabag and Wak-Wak situated in Pampanga and Aparri (which specialized in trade with Japan and the Kingdom of Ryukyu in Okinawa).

Ma-i Kingdom

Ma-i (also spelled Ma'i, Mai, Ma-yi or Mayi) was a Prehispanic Philippine state whose existence was recorded in the Chinese Imperial annals Zhu Fan Zhi and History of Song. It is also recorded in the Sultanate of Brunei's royal records as the nation of Maidh. This state was said to have been centered on the island of Mindoro.

In Zhao Rugua's account, Zhu fan zhi, Liu-sin (刘罪) was one of the islands in the country known as Ma-i. This is presumed to be Luzon (吕宋).

Traders from Ma-i (麻逸, present-day Mait in northern Mindoro) came to Canton as early as 971 during the Northern Song dynasty (960‒1127). Their activities received the attention of officials at the Chinese Bureau of Maritime Trade. The traders came again in 982. During the Southern Song dynasty, officials at the Chinese Bureau of Maritime Trade in Fujian reported the arrival of more merchants from various Philippine islands: Ma-i, Baipuer 白蒲邇 (present-day Babuyan Islands), and Sandao 三嶋, which was known also as Sanyu 三嶼, a term that was used collectively to refer to the following three islands: Jamayan 加麻延 (present-day Calamian), Balaoyou 巴姥酉 (present-day Palawan),and Pulihuan 蒲裏喚 (perhaps Tuliahan River, near present-day Manila). Their trading activities, especially those by merchants from Sanyu, continued well into the Yuan dynasty (1271‒1368).

See also
 Island of the Jewel

References

Sources
 
 
 
 
 
 
 
 
 
 
 
 
 
 
 
 
 
 
 
 
 
 
 
 
 
 
 
 
 
 
 
 
 
 
 
 
 
 
 
 
 
 
 
 
 
 
 

 
Historical regions